Kook's Tour is an American comedy television film produced in late 1969 and early 1970. It was the final film to star the Three Stooges and was originally intended as the pilot for a television series. However, on January 9, 1970, before filming was completed, Larry Fine suffered a severe stroke, paralyzing the left side of his body. When it became clear that Fine was not expected to recover fully from the stroke, production of the series was cancelled and the Kook's Tour pilot film was shelved.

Plot
Kook's Tour was conceived by Moe Howard's son-in-law, frequent Three Stooges collaborator Norman Maurer, as a weekly television series that would have mixed the Stooges' brand of farce comedy with a documentary travelogue format. The concept of the series was that, after 50 years of comic mayhem, the Stooges (Moe, Larry Fine and Joe DeRita) have retired and are traveling the world with their dog, Moose, motor home, and motor boat (which is transported from place to place via a cargo plane). The 52-minute pilot film for the series saw the Stooges exploring the wilderness of the western United States, including areas of Wyoming and Idaho. In the meantime, Larry keeps getting snubbed when trying to catch a fish and getting a picture of a deer. At the end of the pilot film, Larry, in frustration, throws his hat into the water and fish bite on the fishing hooks attached to it. Larry starts to get excited about catching some fish, but Curly Joe counts the fish and says "One for me, one for Moe, and one for....Moose!"

The epilogue shows Moe sitting in an office, discussing the trip and stating that their next destination for the second episode (which was ultimately never produced) was Japan. (Moe makes no reference to Larry's stroke, so it's unknown if this scene was filmed before or after Larry's stroke).

Cast
 Moe Howard as Moe (final film)
 Larry Fine as Larry (final film)
 Joe DeRita as Curly Joe (final film)
 Moose the Dog as himself
 Norman Maurer  as camper
 Jeffrey Scott as young camper
 Michael Maurer as man carrying suitcases
 Lois Goleman as Littering woman
 Emil Sitka (archive footage)
 John Cliff (archive footage)
 Annie Smith as Woman
 Roger Thompson as Man

Production notes
Kook's Tour was the third time the Stooges had tried to create a live-action television series, after their first attempt with Jerks of All Trades in 1949, and then The Three Stooges Scrapbook in 1960.

Kook's Tour was actually their fourth attempt for a TV series. "Gold Raiders" (1951) was an independently produced theatrical feature also intended to become a television series, with Moe, Larry and Shemp. The film was unsuccessful and a TV series was aborted.

The name is a pun on the term "Cook's Tour", which was popularized by the Thomas Cook travel company. The film also served as a promotional vehicle for the Chrysler Corporation. All the vehicles shown in this movie were produced by Chrysler, Chrysler RV, and Chrysler Marine Division.

Following Larry's stroke and the cancellation of Kook's Tour, the film remained unreleased for several years. Director Norman Maurer eventually edited all usable footage into a 52-minute film and released it through Niles Film Products in Super 8 Sound home movie format in 1975. It has since been released in VHS and DVD formats.
Kook's Tour was also sold through Blackhawk Films, Davenport Iowa. 
There was only one additional day of filming planned for Kook's Tour, at a park in LA, mainly for close-ups.

There is only one known 16mm original master print of Kook's Tour, belonging to a private owner in Florida. This film was purchased with documentation, through Chrysler Corp. who sponsored the movie. The film was shot in no-fade Kodachrome color with optical soundtrack. This 16mm original proves beyond all doubt that super 8 prints are not the only version and that the original 16mm film exists. 
This historical print was made widely available to purchase. However, there was no legitimate offer. 
The additional information regarding this film are supported by facts. Attempts to claim a "Citation Needed" is false.

See also
 List of American films of 1970

References

External links
 
 
Kook's Tour at threestooges.net
Three Stooges.com description

1970 films
The Three Stooges films
Chrysler
1970 comedy films
1970s English-language films
Films directed by Norman Maurer
1970s American films